The 2022 Hawaii gubernatorial election took place on November 8, 2022, to elect the next governor of Hawaii. Incumbent Democratic Governor David Ige was term-limited and ineligible to run for a third term. Incumbent lieutenant governor Josh Green was the Democratic nominee, and faced former lieutenant governor Duke Aiona, the Republican nominee. This marked the third time Aiona had been the Republican gubernatorial nominee, having previously run unsuccessfully in 2010 and 2014. Green won the election with 63.2% of the vote with Aiona receiving 36.8% of the vote.

Green's performance was the highest percentage of the vote ever received by any gubernatorial candidate in the state's history. Despite this, Aiona performed 3 points better and received 20,000 more raw votes than Andria Tupola did in 2018.

Democratic primary

Governor

Candidates

Nominee
 Josh Green, lieutenant governor of Hawaii (2018–present) and former state senator (2008–2018)

Eliminated in primary
 David Bourgoin, candidate for mayor of Honolulu in 2020
 Vicky Cayetano, former First Lady of Hawaii (1997–2002) and wife to former governor Ben Cayetano
 Richard Kim, dentist, musician, and candidate for governor in 2018
 Clyde Lewman, realtor
 Van Tanabe, perennial candidate

Withdrew
 Kirk Caldwell, former mayor of Honolulu (2013–2021) and former state representative (2002–2008)

Declined
 Donovan Dela Cruz, state senator (2011–present) 
 Sharon Har, state representative (2007–present)

Endorsements

Polling 
Graphical summary

Results

Lieutenant governor

Candidates

Nominee
 Sylvia Luke, state representative (1999–present) and House Finance Committee chair (2013–present)

Eliminated in primary
 Keith Amemiya, business executive and candidate for mayor of Honolulu in 2020
 Ikaika Anderson, former member (2009–2020) and chair (2019–2020) of the Honolulu City Council
 Daniel H. Cunningham, independent candidate for governor in 2002 and 2010
 Sherry Menor-McNamara, president and CEO of Chamber of Commerce Hawaii (2013–present)

Withdrew
 Jill Tokuda, former state senator (2006–2018) and candidate for lieutenant governor in 2018 (running for U.S. House)

Declined
 Kym Pine, former state representative, former Honolulu City Councilmember, and candidate for Mayor of Honolulu in 2020
 Scott Saiki, Speaker of the Hawaii House of Representatives
 Donovan Dela Cruz, state senator
 Sergio Alcubilla, attorney and former director of external relations, Legal Aid Society of Hawaii (running for Hawaii's 1st congressional district)
 Joey Manahan, Honolulu City Councilmember (2013–2021) and former state representative (2007–2013)

Endorsements

Polling

Results

Republican primary

Governor

Candidates

Nominee
 Duke Aiona, former Lieutenant Governor (2002–2010) and nominee for governor in 2010 and 2014

Eliminated in primary
 Gary Cordery, businessman
 George Hawat
 Keline-Kameyo Kahau, Aloha ʻĀina candidate for Hawaii House of Representatives in 2020 (also filed for Aloha ʻĀina primary)
 Lynn Barry Mariano, retired Army Officer and Civil Servant
 Paul Morgan, business consultant and former member of the Hawaii Army National Guard
 Moses Paskowitz, realtor
 B.J. Penn, mixed martial arts and Brazilian jiu-jitsu practitioner and former UFC Champion
 Heidi Tsuneyoshi, Honolulu City Councilmember
 Walter Woods

Declined
 Peter Savio, businessperson and real estate developer
 Andria Tupola, Honolulu City Councilmember (2021–present), former Minority Leader of the Hawaii House of Representatives (2017–2018), and nominee for governor in 2018

Endorsements

Polling

Results

Lieutenant governor

Candidates

Nominee
 Seaula Tupa'i Jr., pastor

Eliminated in primary
 Rob Burns, realtor
 Tae Kim, candidate for Honolulu prosecutor in 2020

Results

Nonpartisan primary
Under Hawaii law, a nonpartisan candidate must either receive at least ten percent of the vote for that office (32,729 votes for governor or 30,918 votes for lieutenant governor) or receive a vote "equal to or greater than the lowest vote received by the partisan candidate who was nominated" (37,608 votes for governor or 35,798 votes for lieutenant governor) to qualify for the general election ballot. Because none of the nonpartisan candidates for governor or lieutenant governor met that threshold, no nonpartisan candidates for governor or lieutenant governor advanced to the general election.

Governor

Candidates

Eliminated in primary
Keleionalani Taylor, activist
Caleb Nazara, pastor

Results

Lieutenant Governor

Candidates

Nominee
Charles Keoho

Results

General election

Predictions

Endorsements

Results

Notes

Partisan clients

References

External links
Official campaign websites
 Duke Aiona (R) for Governor
 Mihail Gilevich (I) for Governor
 Josh Green (D) for Governor
 T. K. Hinshaw (L) for Governor

Hawaii
2022
Governor